There are two species of lizard named ghost anole:

 Anolis lemurinus, found in Central and South America
 Anolis spectrum, found in Cuba